Leland Stanford Jr. (May 14, 1868 – March 13, 1884), known as Leland DeWitt Stanford until he was nine, was the only son of American industrialist and politician Leland Stanford and his wife Jane. Following his death from typhoid at age 15, he became the namesake of Stanford University, which is officially called Leland Stanford Junior University.

Early life
He was the only child of California Governor Leland Stanford and his wife, Jane Stanford (née Lathrop). His mother was 39 and had an 18-year childless marriage up to the point of his birth.

Illness and death
Leland caught typhoid two months before his 16th birthday on a Grand Tour of Europe with his parents. He originally fell ill in Athens. His parents rushed him to Italy for medical treatment, first to Naples, then to Rome, and eventually to Florence, where he died after weeks of a condition that alternately improved and worsened.

Legacy
Leland Stanford Sr. told his wife that "the children of California shall be our children." To honor their son, once they had returned to the United States, the Stanfords devoted their fortune to a memorial in his name, Leland Stanford Junior University, which opened its doors in 1891.

Leland Stanford Jr. is interred beside his parents at the Stanford family mausoleum on the Stanford campus. After the death of his father on June 21, 1893, his mother guided the development of the university until her murder on February 28, 1905.

Nomenclature
Although the university is generally referred to as "Stanford University" or "Stanford," its official name is still "Leland Stanford Junior University," as is seen on the university seal.

References

External links

Johnston, Theresa, "About a Boy," Stanford, July–August 2003

1868 births
1884 deaths
Deaths from typhoid fever
People from Santa Clara County, California
Stanford University people
Infectious disease deaths in Tuscany